Maxine Matilpi (1956) is a Kwakwaka'wakw artist from Alert Bay, Canada.

Her work is included in the collections of the Seattle Art Museum, the McCord Museum, and the Museum of Fine Arts, Boston.

References

1956 births
20th-century American women artists
21st-century American women artists
Native American artists
Living people